Monika Borowicz (born 5 January 1982) is a Polish sprint canoer who has competed since the late 2000s. She won a bronze medal in the K-4 500 m event at the 2007 ICF Canoe Sprint World Championships in Duisburg.

References

1982 births
Living people
Polish female canoeists
Place of birth missing (living people)
ICF Canoe Sprint World Championships medalists in kayak
21st-century Polish women